The Midwest Electric Railway (initialized MERA, reporting mark MERA) is a non-profit trolley operation located on the grounds of the Midwest Old Threshers Reunion in Mt. Pleasant, Iowa, United States. It is home to 10 pieces of trolley history that are regularly operated on a 2.5 mile loop surrounding the organization's campgrounds.

Overview 

The volunteer association runs a tourist railroad which operates electric trolleys around a 2.5 mile loop around the Midwest Old Threshers Reunion campground. Guest prices and hours of operation vary throughout the year based on the activities of the Midwest Old Threshers Association. The trolley operation is most active on the five days preceding Labor Day during the reunion. The trolleys operate on special holidays and when special organized groups reserve time. Visit the Old Threshers Reunion website for the latest information.

The campground's trolley tracks were originally constructed by the Midwest Electric Railway's volunteers and are still maintained today through volunteer efforts.  Every year maintenance and reconstruction is organized and accomplished entirely through volunteer labor.

Location 
The Midwest Electric Railway is located in the heart of Mt. Pleasant, Iowa on the campgrounds of the Midwest Old Thresher's Reunion sandwiched between Locust and S. Walnut Streets.  The railroad crosses E. Thresher Road in two places.    The main headquarters for MERA and trolley storage is in a silver-painted trolley barn which is located on S. Locust Road less than a half mile from south of Thresher Road.

History 
The Midwest Electric Railway, a not-for-profit educational organization, was founded in 19xx . Its goal at that time was to preserve historic electric-powered passenger trolleys that had operated in Iowa and transport passengers around the campground during the Midwest Old Thresher's Reunion.  The original trolley stops were the trolley depot, the trolley barn, and campers' gate.

Today, the purpose of the organization remains largely the same including the preservation of non-Iowa operated electric rolling stock.  Trolley Stops currently include The Trolley Depot, the Trolley Barn, the Log Village, Lakeview, South 40, and Campers' Gate.

Equipment

Trolleys 

Streetcar #381
Usage: City Streetcar/One-man Safety Car
Circa 1930s – 1950s
Operated: Knoxville, Tennessee; later Waterloo, Iowa
From: Waterloo, Cedar Falls and Northern Railroad
Builder: Perley Thomas, 1930
Notes: Last streetcar to run in an Iowa municipality; The “Safety Car”, a landmark design which eliminated all boarding and alighting mishaps as doors were open only when the car was stopped. Improved safety in one-man operation. A landmark design in which boarding and alighting mishaps were eliminated, since doors opened only when car was stopped and car could not start until doors closed

Streetcar #1945
Usage: Lightweight City Car/One-man Safety Car
Circa 1920s
Operated: Milan, Italy
From: Azienda Trasporti Municipale, Milan, Italy
Builder: Carminati & Toselli, Milan, 1927; Running gear by Italian General Electric
Notes: Lightweight for fast city service in narrow streets; Lightweight safety car: doors only open when stopped

Streetcars #1718 and #1779
Usage: City & Interurban, Open Cars/Open Bench Summer Cars
Circa 1888-1940s
Operated:
From: Rio de Janeiro Tramway
Builder: Rio De Janeiro, Brazil, 1911 using the American design of J.G. Brill Company, Philadelphia, Pennsylvania; Running gear by Westinghouse Electric Co.
Notes: Thousands of streetcars in America were of this patented “Naragansett” design, featuring a full-length upper side step for easy boarding; Favorites for summer travel

Streetcar #9
Usage: Suburban Passenger Service/Express Car
Circa 1910s
Operated: between Centerville, Albia, and Mystic, Iowa
From: Southern Iowa Railway, Centerville, Iowa
Builder: Barber Car Co., York, Pennsylvania, 1912 as a 4-wheel car (original); Southern Iowa Railway to an 8-wheel car (rebuilt)
Notes: Street and intercity service; 4 wheels = rough riding

Streetcar #320
Usage: High-speed Heavy Interurban Car/Intercity and commuter travel
Circa 1910s – 1940s
Operated: Southern Iowa Railway
From: Chicago Aurora and Elgin Railroad
Builder: Jewett Car Company, Newark, Ohio, 1914
Notes: Heavyweight for high-speed long-distance travel (up to 80 MPH)

Structures 

The Chicago Burlington and Quincy depot from Yarmouth, Iowa, was donated and moved to Old Thresher's fairgrounds; it was originally used as the trolley ticket office and gift shop.  The building was used for storage and the aesthetic appearance of having an old building near a trolley stop, but again serves as a ticket office.

The Trolley Barn was built in the early 1970s to store the growing stock of equipment.  While the building has no real antique value, it provides a well-used maintenance pit for trolley maintenance, room for trolley storage, and a health & welfare room for volunteer operators and conductors.

Special events

Midwest Old Thresher's Reunion 

Every year during the week leading up to Labor Day weekend, volunteer operators and conductors regularly operate the trolleys to ferry campground dwellers and rail enthusiasts around the 2.5 mile campground loop.  The Log Village at the south end of the loop provides the tourist a view of 19th century life on the Iowa prairie.  Camper's use the trolley's to commute to the main fairgrounds to visit daily attractions.

Haunted Trolley Ride 

Every year near Halloween, the Midwest Electric Railway operates a haunted trolley ride.

Trolley School 

Once a year at in June, Midwest Electric Railway holds a Trolley School to teach anyone to operate a Trolley, then allowing them time to operate some of the fleet.

See also 
 List of United States railroads
 List of Iowa railroads
 List of heritage railroads in the United States
 List of railway museums

References 

Terry, Jeff. "The Midwest Electric Railway", Railfan & Railroad magazine, June 2008

External links 

 Midwest Electric Railway – Official Website
 Jon Bell's MERA website

Iowa railroads
Railroad museums in Iowa
Heritage railroads in Iowa
Museums in Henry County, Iowa